The Southern Aeronautical Scamp is an American aircraft designed for homebuilt construction and Formula V Air Racing.

Design and development
The Scamp is a single place, mid-wing aircraft with conventional landing gear. The fuselage is constructed with steel tubing and covered with fabric. The wings are of all wood construction.

Specifications (Scamp)

See also

References

Renegade
1960s United States sport aircraft
Single-engined tractor aircraft
Mid-wing aircraft
Homebuilt aircraft